Malikia granosa is a Gram-negative, rod-shaped, motile bacterium with one to two polar flagella from the new genus Malikia in family Comamonadaceae. It was isolated from activated sludge of a municipal wastewater treatment plant. Colonies of M. granosa are creamy–white in color.

References

External links
Type strain of Malikia granosa at BacDive -  the Bacterial Diversity Metadatabase

Comamonadaceae
Bacteria described in 2005